This page describes the qualification procedure for EuroBasket Women 2009.

Qualification format
The Qualifying Round was held from August 13 to September 13, 2008.

The top 2 teams in each group and the best team in 3rd place qualified to EuroBasket Women 2009.

The best 6 of the remaining teams will go to the Additional Qualifying Round, from which 2 additional teams will qualify to EuroBasket Women 2009.

The last 4 teams will play in the Relegation Round, from which 2 teams will relegate to Division B in 2010–2011.

The Additional Qualifying Round and the Relegation Round will be held from January 4 to January 19, 2009.

Qualifying round
The draw for the Qualifying Round was held on February 16, 2008. The remaining 19 teams in Division A were divided into 3 groups of 5 teams and one group of 4 teams.
(teams in bold qualified to EuroBasket Women 2009)

 Qualified for EuroBasket Women 2009
 Go to Additional Qualifying Round
 Go to Relegation Round

Group A

Group B

Group C

Group D

Additional Qualifying Round

Group A

Group B

External links
 Eurobasket qualification at FIBA-Europe.com

EuroBasket Women qualification
EuroBasket Women 2009
2008–09 in European women's basketball